The Neckars Formation is a Pleistocene geologic formation in Germany. In the Sackdillinger Cave, it preserves fossils of the frogs Rana temporaria and Bufo sp. and the bear Ursus sackdillingensis.

See also 
 List of fossiliferous stratigraphic units in Germany

References

Bibliography 
 

Geologic formations of Germany
Pleistocene Europe
Paleontology in Germany